The 2016–2017 season was the 92nd season of competitive football in Poland.

League competitions

Ekstraklasa

Regular season

Championship round

Relegation round

I liga

Polish Cup

Polish SuperCup

Polish clubs in Europe

Legia Warsaw

2016–17 UEFA Champions League

Qualifying phase

Group stage

2016–17 UEFA Europa League

Knockout phase

Notes

Piast Gliwice
2016–17 UEFA Europa League

Qualifying phase

Zagłębie Lubin
2016–17 UEFA Europa League

Qualifying phase

Cracovia
2016–17 UEFA Europa League

Qualifying phase

National teams

Poland national team

Notes and references